Koumba Larroque (born 22 August 1998) is a French freestyle wrestler. She is a three-time medalist at the World Wrestling Championships and a three-time medalist, including gold, at the European Wrestling Championships. She also represented France at the 2020 Summer Olympics in Tokyo, Japan.

Career 

At the 2014 Summer Youth Olympics held in Nanjing, China, she won the bronze medal in the girls' 60 kg event. She won the gold medal in her event at both the 2016 European Juniors Wrestling Championships held in Bucharest, Romania and the 2016 World Junior Wrestling Championships held in Mâcon, France. She also competed at the first and second World Olympic Qualification tournaments hoping to qualify for the 2016 Summer Olympics in Rio de Janeiro, Brazil.

In 2017, she won the gold medal in the 69 kg event at both the European U23 Wrestling Championship held in Szombathely, Hungary and the World U23 Wrestling Championship held in Bydgoszcz, Poland. She also won the gold medal in her event at the European Juniors Wrestling Championships held in Dortmund, Germany. In the same year, at the World Championships held in Paris, France, she won one of the bronze medals in the 69 kg event. She also won one of the bronze medals at the European Championships by defeating Elis Manolova of Azerbaijan in the 69 kg event.

She competed at the 2018 European U23 Wrestling Championship held in Istanbul, Turkey where she won the gold medal in the women's 72 kg event. She won the silver medal in the 68 kg event at the 2018 World Wrestling Championships as well as the silver medal in the 68 kg event at the 2018 European Wrestling Championships held in Kaspiysk, Russia.

In 2019, she competed in the 68 kg event at the World Championships without winning a medal; she lost her second match, against Jenny Fransson of Sweden, and she was then eliminated in the repechage. In 2020, she competed in the 68 kg event at the European Championships also without winning a medal; in this competition she won her first match against Ilana Kratysh of Israel but she was eliminated in her next match by Alla Cherkasova of Ukraine. Cherkasova went on to win one of the bronze medals. In the same year, she was eliminated in her first match in the women's 68 kg event at the 2020 Individual Wrestling World Cup held in Belgrade, Serbia.

In March 2021, she qualified at the European Qualification Tournament to compete at the 2020 Summer Olympics in Tokyo, Japan. A month later, she won the gold medal in the 68 kg event at the European Wrestling Championships held in Warsaw, Poland. She defeated Khanum Velieva of Russia in the final. A few months later, she won the gold medal in her event at the 2021 Poland Open held in Warsaw, Poland.

She competed in the women's 68 kg event at the 2020 Summer Olympics where she was eliminated in her first match by Soronzonboldyn Battsetseg of Mongolia. Two months after the Olympics, she competed in the women's 65 kg event at the 2021 World Wrestling Championships held in Oslo, Norway. She won her first two matches, against Elis Manolova of Azerbaijan and Tetiana Rizhko of Ukraine, and she was then eliminated in her next match by eventual bronze medalist Forrest Molinari of the United States.

At the 2021 U23 World Wrestling Championships held in Belgrade, Serbia, she won the gold medal in the 68 kg event. She won one of the bronze medals in the 65kg event at the 2022 World Wrestling Championships held in Belgrade, Serbia.

She won the gold medal in the women's 68kg event at the Grand Prix de France Henri Deglane 2023 held in Nice, France. She also won the gold medal in her event at the 2023 Grand Prix Zagreb Open held in Zagreb, Croatia. She won the silver medal in her event at the 2023 Ibrahim Moustafa Tournament held in Alexandria, Egypt.

Personal life 

She was born in Arpajon, France. Her mother is from Mali and her father is from France.

Achievements

References

External links 

 

Living people
1998 births
People from Arpajon
French female sport wrestlers
Wrestlers at the 2014 Summer Youth Olympics
World Wrestling Championships medalists
European Wrestling Championships medalists
Wrestlers at the 2020 Summer Olympics
Olympic wrestlers of France
European Wrestling Champions
Sportspeople from Essonne
21st-century French women